The Grauhorn is a mountain of the Lepontine Alps, located on the border between the Swiss cantons of Ticino and Graubünden. It lies north of the Rheinwaldhorn, on the range between the Val Carassino and the Länta valley.

On the north side of the mountain is a glacier named Grauhorngletscher.

References

External links

 Grauhorn on Hikr

Mountains of the Alps
Mountains of Switzerland
Mountains of Graubünden
Mountains of Ticino
Graubünden–Ticino border
Lepontine Alps